Matoatoa spannringi is a species of gecko part of the lizard family Gekkonidae. The species is endemic to Madagascar.

Etymology
The specific name, spannringi, honors botanist Jürgen Spannring, who collected the holotype.

Geographic range
M. spannringi is found in southeastern Madagascar.

Habitat

Description

Reproduction
M. spannringi is oviparous.

References

Further reading
Funnell S, Shrum M, Ellis E, Andreone F (2012). "A new record of the phantom gecko Matoatoa spannringi from Sainte Luce, SE Madagascar augments the species' known range". Herpetology Notes 5: 151–153.
Glaw F, Vences M (2006). A Field Guide to the Amphibians and Reptiles of Madagascar, Third Edition. Cologne, Germany: Vences & Glaw Verlag. 496 pp. .
Nussbaum RA, Raxworthy CJ, Pronk O (1998). "The Ghost Geckos of Madagascar: A Further Revision of the Malagasy Leaf-toed Geckos (Reptilia, Squamata, Gekkonidae)". Miscellaneous Publications, Museum of Zoology, University of Michigan (186): 1–26. (Matoatoa spannringi, new species, p. 12).
Rösler H (2000). "Kommentierte Liste der rezent, subrezent und fossil bekannten Geckotaxa (Reptilia: Gekkonomorpha)". Gekkota 2: 28–153. (Matoatoa spannringi, p. 95). (in German).

Matoatoa
Reptiles described in 1998
Reptiles of Madagascar
Endemic fauna of Madagascar